NISC may refer to:

 No instruction set computing, an architecture designed for efficiency
 National Invitational Softball Championship, an American collegiate sports tournament
 National center of Incident readiness and Strategy for Cybersecurity, Japan's government institute for cybersecurity

See also